Ophioscincus is a genus of skink known to inhabit parts of Australia.

Classification
Ophioscincus cooloolensis Greer & Cogger, 1985 Cooloola snake-skink
Ophioscincus ophioscincus (Boulenger, 1887) Yolk-bellied snake-skink
Ophioscincus truncatus (Peters, 1876) Short-limbed snake-skink

References 

Reptiles of Australia skink page Listing of Australian Skinks

Ophioscincus
Lizard genera
Skinks of Australia
Taxa named by Wilhelm Peters